Polypterus congicus, the Congo bichir, is a species of bichir with a maximum recorded size of . The colour also varies from yellowish brown to grey, darker in the top, paler in the ventral area. It has a pattern of around 8 irregular vertical bands along the flanks of the fish, that do not extend completely onto the ventral surface. The lower jaw is prominent, much like Polypterus endlicheri. The male has a wider and thicker anal fin. These fish are commonly sold as pets.

See also
List of freshwater aquarium fish species

References

 

Polypteridae
Taxa named by George Albert Boulenger
Fish described in 1898